George William Smith Jr. is a lieutenant general in the United States Marine Corps who serves as commander of the I Marine Expeditionary Force since September 23, 2021. He most recently served as the Deputy Commandant for Plans, Policies, and Operations until August 2021. He previously served as Senior Military Assistant to the United States Secretary of Defense, a position for which he was nominated by James Mattis in September 2018. He was commissioned in 1985 after graduating from the University of North Carolina at Chapel Hill, through a Naval ROTC program. He is the son of George W. Smith, who was a major general in the Marine Corps.

Military career
Smith was commissioned in the United States Marine Corps as a second lieutenant in 1985 following graduation from the NROTC program at the University of North Carolina at Chapel Hill. Smith graduated from The Basic School and the Infantry Officers Course, then reported to 2nd Battalion, 1st Marines where he served as a rifle platoon commander and later as the 81 mm Mortar Platoon Commander. He then transferred to 1st Battalion, 3rd Marines, serving as Logistics Officer and Rifle Company Commander. He has served staff billets including Series and Company Commander, Marine Corps Recruit Depot San Diego; Inspector-Instructor, 4th Force Reconnaissance Company; Future Operations Planner, I Marine Expeditionary Force G-3 and G-5; and Deputy Operations Officer, 1st Marine Division. As a lieutenant colonel, Smith assumed command of 1st Force Reconnaissance Company, during which he deployed twice in support of Operation Iraqi Freedom. From 2007 to 2010, Smith was the Commanding Officer, The Basic School in Quantico, Virginia.

As a General Officer, Smith served as Commanding General, Marine Corps Air Ground Combat Center, Twentynine Palms, California; Deputy Commander, Regional Command Southwest in Helmand Province, Afghanistan; Deputy Commanding General, Marine Corps Combat Development Command, Quantico, Virginia; Director, Manpower Plans and Policy Division, Quantico, Virginia, Director, Strategy, Plans and Policy Directorate, United States Central Command, MacDill AFB, Florida, and most recently as the Senior Military Assistant to the Secretary of Defense. He assumed his duties as Deputy Commandant for Plans, Policies, and Operations from August 2019 to August 2021.

Awards and decorations

References

Living people
Recipients of the Defense Superior Service Medal
Recipients of the Legion of Merit
United States Marine Corps generals
United States Marine Corps personnel of the Iraq War
United States Marine Corps personnel of the War in Afghanistan (2001–2021)
University of North Carolina at Chapel Hill alumni
Year of birth missing (living people)